Appaji Channabasavaraja Shankararao Nadagouda, also referred to as C. S. Nadagouda is a  Congress Politician from Karnataka and 5-Time MLA representing Muddebihal constituency. He served as Special Representative of Karnataka Government at Delhi between 2014-2018.

References

Sources
 https://www.thehindu.com/news/national/karnataka/gulbarga-airport-state-to-bring-pressure-on-centre/article7160881.ece#!
 https://zeenews.india.com/news/karnataka/karnatakas-special-representative-backs-spendthrift-governor_1607295.html
 https://timesofindia.indiatimes.com/city/bengaluru/opportunists-defectors-preferred-over-loyalists-in-modern-day-politics/articleshow/74015404.cms
 https://timesofindia.indiatimes.com/city/bengaluru/Karnataka-cabinet-rejig-14-ministers-removed-13-get-in/articleshow/52826301.cms
 http://myneta.info/karnataka2013/candidate.php?candidate_id=6
 http://myneta.info/karnataka2018/candidate.php?candidate_id=6106
 http://myneta.info/karnatka2008/candidate.php?candidate_id=457

Indian National Congress politicians from Karnataka
Year of birth missing (living people)
Living people
Karnataka MLAs 1999–2004
Karnataka MLAs 2004–2007
Karnataka MLAs 2008–2013
Karnataka MLAs 2013–2018
People from Bijapur district, Karnataka